Skylarking is the debut studio album by Horace Andy. It was released on Studio One in 1972. Not to be confused with his later album, also titled Skylarking, released in 1996. The backing band was Sound Dimension - Coxsone Dodd's studio band, led by Leroy Sibbles.

Reception
In 2012, Skylarking was placed at number 16 on the "Top 50 Reggae Albums" list, which was compiled by Jamaican disc jockey Clinton Lindsay and his colleague Marlon Burrell in commemoration of Jamaica's 50th anniversary as an independent nation. In 2014, Mojo placed it at number 43 on its list of the "50 Greatest Reggae Albums". In 2016, GQ named it as one of the "10 Classic LPs from Reggae's Golden Era".

Track listing

Personnel
Horace Andy - vocals
Sound Dimension - backing musicians
Clement S. Dodd - producer, recording, mixing
Sylvan Morris - mixing

References

External links
 

1972 debut albums
Horace Andy albums
Albums produced by Coxsone Dodd
Studio One (record label) albums